The 1999 ANZ Tasmanian International doubles was the doubles event of the sixth edition of the ANZ Tasmanian International. Virginia Ruano Pascual and Paola Suárez were the defending champions but only Ruano Pascual competed that year with Florencia Labat. Labat and Ruano Pascual lost in the first round to Nannie de Villiers and Eva Melicharová.

Mariaan de Swardt and Elena Tatarkova won in the final 6–1, 6–2 against Alexia Dechaume-Balleret and Émilie Loit.

Seeds

Draw

Qualifying

Seeds

Qualifiers
  Lilia Osterloh /  Mashona Washington

Lucky losers
 ''' Květa Hrdličková /  Tina Križan

Qualifying draw

External links
 1999 ANZ Tasmanian International Doubles Draw

Hobart International – Doubles
Doubles